Álvaro Franz Calustro Cárdenas (born March 9, 1974) is a retired Bolivian football midfielder.

International career
Calustro obtained a total number of nine caps for the Bolivia national football team during his career. He was a member of the national squad competing at the 2001 Copa América.

References

External links

1974 births
Living people
Sportspeople from Cochabamba
Association football midfielders
Bolivian footballers
Bolivia international footballers
Oriente Petrolero players
C.D. Jorge Wilstermann players
Universitario de Sucre footballers
Club Real Potosí players
Municipal Real Mamoré players
2001 Copa América players
Unión Tarija players
Club Atlético Ciclón players